{{DISPLAYTITLE:Phi1 Lupi}}

Phi1 Lupi is a solitary star in the southern constellation of Lupus. It is visible to the naked eye with an apparent visual magnitude of 3.58. Based upon an annual parallax shift of 11.86 mas as seen from Earth, it is located around 275 light years from the Sun. The star is drifting closer with a radial velocity of −29 km/s. It has an absolute magnitude of −1.55.

This is an evolved K-type giant star with a stellar classification of K5 III, which means it has used up its core hydrogen and has expanded. At present it has 40 times the radius of the Sun. It is a variable star of unknown type, with an amplitude of 0.008 in visual magnitude and a period of 4.82 days. The star is radiating 711 times the luminosity of the Sun from its enlarged photosphere at an effective temperature of 3,894 K.

References

K-type giants
Suspected variables
Zeta Herculis Moving Group
Lupus (constellation)
Lupi, Phi1
136422
075177
5705
Durchmusterung objects